The Spanish red deer (Cervus elaphus hispanicus), is a subspecies of the red deer native to Spain. The Spanish red deer is a polygynous subspecies, which means the males have two or more mates; during mating season, males show a dark ventral area in their abdomen. The males usually defend the mating territories on the females' favored location.

References

Carranza J. Ciervo — Cervus elaphus. In: Carrascal LM, Salvador A, editors. Enciclopedia Virtual de los Vertebrados Españoles. Madrid: Museo Nacional de Ciencias Naturales; 2004. http://www.vertebradosibericos.org/mamiferos/cerela.html
Carranza, J., Salinas, M., de Andrés, D., Pérez-González, J. (2016). Iberian red deer: paraphyletic nature at mtDNA but nuclear markers support its genetic identity. Ecology and Evolution, 6 (4): 905–922.
De la Pena, Eva. Martin, Jose. Carranza, Juan. “The intensity of male-male competition may affect chemical scent constituents in the dark ventral patch of male Iberian red deer” 3 September 2019.

Cervus